Marcos Marcelo Escobedo (1784–1833) was a military commander in the Mexican War of Independence. He later became Mayor of Colotlán, Jalisco.

Early life
Marcos Escobedo was born in 1784, son of José Joaquín Escobedo, presumably, a descendant of the original Tlaxcaltec colonizers of the region.

Military career
In 1808, he held the title Second Lieutenant in the Spanish army and was governor of the Tlaxcala neighborhood.  On November 1, 1808, he declared himself in favor of Mexico's independence from Spain, and along with a priest named Pablo José Calvillo and the indigenous garrisons of the region, put himself at the service of independence leader Miguel Hidalgo.

In January 1811, he and his troops participated in the Battle of the Bridge of Calderón.  His troops suffered great losses in the battle and returned to Colotlán to face the troops of Francisco del Real, Juan Lozano, and Sebastián Gallegos, who had occupied the town's square in their absence.  In the same month, they faced a battle in Las Canoas with the troops of royalist priest Álvarez known as "El Chicharronero". In April 1811, his troops faced the army of Colonel Pedro Celestino Negrete and were defeated in the Battle of Tierra Blanca.  Marcos Escobedo went into hiding for several years after this defeat.

In 1817, he came out of hiding and once again joined the war for independence, fighting battles in the towns of San Andrés, Chalchihuites and Huejuquilla, gaining control of the region for the independence movement.  He then joined forces with the armies of Tlaltenango and Jerez and launched a military campaign to take Bolaños and then Tepic.

Late life
On September 27, 1820, Marcos Escobedo organized great festivities in Colotlán to celebrate Mexican independence and the entrance of the independence movement's troops into Mexico City. In 1825, Marcos Escobedo was named Mayor of Colotlán.  As mayor, he was charged with subjugating the indigenous groups in the region who opposed the distribution of communal lands. Marcos Escobedo died on August 7, 1833.

References
 Bernardo Carlos Casas. Historia de Colotlán.
 José María Muria. Sumario histórico de Jalisco.

1784 births
1833 deaths
Colonial Mexico
Military history of Mexico
People of the Mexican War of Independence
Mexican rebels
People from Jalisco
Indigenous Mexicans